Pedro Manuel Martins Araújo (born 10 January 1985) is a Portuguese professional footballer who plays as a left back.

Club career
Born in Viatodos, Barcelos, Araújo joined Sporting Clube de Portugal's youth system in 1998. After making his senior debut with the B-team he signed with fellow Portuguese Second Division club C.D. Olivais e Moscavide, moving straight into the Primeira Liga with F.C. Penafiel in 2005 and making his debut in the competition on 18 September by playing the full 90 minutes in a 2–2 away draw against C.S. Marítimo.

Araújo all but competed in the Segunda Liga in the following decade. In 2012, he signed for C.D. Tondela, scoring his first goal for his new team in a 1–3 loss at F.C. Arouca.

In July 2015, after starting in all his 40 league appearances as the side promoted to the top flight for the first time in their history, Araújo returned to Penafiel.

International career
Araújo earned 34 caps for Portugal at youth level, scoring three goals. He represented the nation at the 2005 Toulon Tournament.

Club statistics

Honours
Beira-Mar
Segunda Liga: 2009–10

Gil Vicente
Segunda Liga: 2010–11

Tondela
Segunda Liga: 2014–15

References

External links

1985 births
Living people
People from Barcelos, Portugal
Portuguese footballers
Portuguese expatriate footballers
Association football defenders
Primeira Liga players
Liga Portugal 2 players
Segunda Divisão players
Primera Divisió players
Sporting CP B players
C.D. Olivais e Moscavide players
F.C. Penafiel players
S.C. Beira-Mar players
Gil Vicente F.C. players
C.D. Trofense players
C.D. Tondela players
FC Lusitanos players
Portugal youth international footballers
Portugal under-21 international footballers
Portuguese expatriate sportspeople in Andorra
Expatriate footballers in Andorra
Sportspeople from Braga District